Food, Culture & Society is a peer-reviewed academic journal covering all aspects of sociological research on the interrelationships between food and culture. It was established in 1996 as the Journal of the Association for the Study of Food and Society and renamed Journal for the Study of Food and Society in 1998, before obtaining its current name in 2003. It is published by  Routledge on behalf of the Association for the Study of Food and Society and the editor-in-chief is Megan J. Elias (Boston University).

Abstracting and indexing
The journal is abstracted and indexed in:

According to the Journal Citation Reports, the journal has a 2020 impact factor of 1.130.

References

External links

Sociology journals
5 times per year journals
Routledge academic journals
English-language journals
Publications established in 1996